The Junkers Ju 160 was a German single-engine, low-wing six-seat passenger transport aircraft developed from the Ju 60 and targeted at the same fast airliner market as the Heinkel He 70 and the Lockheed Model 9 Orion. The Deutsche Lufthansa fleet of 21 aircraft began operations in 1935 and continued until the start of World War II.

Design and development
The earlier Ju 60 from which the Ju 160 was developed was not fast enough to compete with the Heinkel He 70 and only about three were used by Lufthansa in the period 1933-6. The Ju 160 was cleaned up aerodynamically and had a more powerful engine, that combination making it about 72 km/h (45 mph) faster. Like the Ju 60 and in the Junkers' tradition, the Ju 160 was a low-wing cantilever design, the wings being built around twin duralumin spars and covered in sheet duralumin. For the first time, though, a Junkers aircraft used entirely smooth skinning; the Ju 60 had a smooth-skinned fuselage but the traditional corrugated flying surfaces. The improved performance of the Ju 160 was in part due to this change of skinning. The wing planform was also revised to have taper only on the leading edge. The trailing edge carried the usual Junkers "double wing", a full-width adjustable flap cum aileron arrangement.

Other aerodynamic improvements included a cockpit enclosure better faired into the fuselage and a seriously revised undercarriage which now retracted inwards into the underside of the wing where the wheels were completely enclosed. The Ju 60 undercarriage left the wheels partially protruding in Douglas DC-3 fashion on retraction. Finally, the power was increased by 10% with a 490 kW (660 hp) BMW 132E radial engine.

Seating was for six passengers in two forward-facing and one rear-facing pairs. The crew, pilot and radio operator sat in tandem in an enclosed cockpit with rudder pedals, folding control column and seat for a second pilot to starboard.

The first prototype Ju 160 V1, D-UNOR, was taken from the Ju 60 construction line and first flew in January 1934. Lufthansa used it in trials and a number of changes were made to the final prototype (V3), including  a wider chord, less deep rudder and a faired tailwheel plus minor door modifications. The first civil production series were designated Ju 160 A-0. The second prototype V2 was for a military version.

Operational history
Including prototypes, 47 Ju 160s were produced. Lufthansa were the main commercial operator, receiving 21 production aircraft. They were running on 13 domestic routes in 1935 alone and stayed in service for example on the fast route between Berlin and Vienna until 1941. One of the 21 was initially operated by the Lufthansa subsidiary Eurasia; this aircraft, however, crashed in Shanghai and was taken back to Germany and to Lufthansa after repairs. The first 11 Lufthansa machines were Ju 160 A-0s registered in 1935, followed by 10 D-0s in 1936. The D-0 version had larger cockpit windows and other crew comfort enhancements. Weser Flugbau used an ex-Lufthansa aircraft. Two machines appeared on the Manchurian civil register, one of then having earlier been registered in Germany, the other sold direct.

The German Research Institute for Aviation (Deutsche Versuchsanstalt fur Luftfahrt e.V ) operated four Ju 160s. Five others operated at the Flight Research Centre (E-Stelle) at Travemünde. The remaining aircraft were mostly military versions. Most of the surviving civilian Ju 160s in Germany were eventually impressed in Luftwaffe service. The Manchurian aircraft appear to have ended up in Japan.

Operators

Deutsche Lufthansa
Luftwaffe

Imperial Japanese Navy Air Service as the "LXJ"

Specifications (Ju 160)

See also

References

Bibliography
 Andersson, Lennart. "Chinese 'Junks': Junkers Aircraft Exports to China 1925-1940". Air Enthusiast, No. 55, Autumn 1994, pp. 2–7. 

1930s German airliners
1930s German military transport aircraft
Ju 160
Single-engined tractor aircraft
Low-wing aircraft
Aircraft first flown in 1934